Janne Karlsson is the name of:
Janne Karlsson (ice hockey, born 1958), Swedish ice hockey coach born in Växjö
Janne Karlsson (ice hockey, born 1964), Swedish ice hockey coach born in Kiruna
Janne Carlsson or Karlsson (1937–2017), Swedish actor

See also
Jan Karlsson (disambiguation)